Col. Olin M. Dantzler House, also known as Crutchfield House, is a historic home located at St. Matthews, Calhoun County, South Carolina. It was built about 1852, as a one-story, rectangular, raised cottage with truncated, hipped roof. Also on the property are a barn, several sheds, visitors’ cottage and a pigeon house. It was originally used as a seasonal residence for the Jacob M. Dantzler family of Orangeburg County. The house is the oldest standing residence in St. Matthews.

It was listed in the National Register of Historic Places in 1973.

References

Houses on the National Register of Historic Places in South Carolina
Houses completed in 1852
Houses in Calhoun County, South Carolina
National Register of Historic Places in Calhoun County, South Carolina
1852 establishments in South Carolina